Andrei Šilin (born 28 August 1978) is an Estonian rower. He competed at the 2000 Summer Olympics and the 2004 Summer Olympics.

References

External links
 
 
 
 

1978 births
Living people
Estonian male rowers
Olympic rowers of Estonia
Rowers at the 2000 Summer Olympics
Rowers at the 2004 Summer Olympics
Sportspeople from Narva